Ukraine competed at the 2022 Winter Olympics in Beijing, China, from 4 to 20 February 2022, in its eighth appearance as an independent nation.

Oleksandr Abramenko and Oleksandra Nazarova were the country's flagbearer during the opening ceremony. Meanwhile biathlete Olena Bilosiuk was the flagbearer during the closing ceremony.

The games were held amidst the 2021–2022 Russo-Ukrainian crisis. Prior to the opening ceremony the Ministry of Youth and Sports of Ukraine advised its athletes to avoid Russians where possible and instructed them how to behave in case they are provoked. The ministry also did not recommend Ukrainian athletes to give interviews in Russian.

Ukrainian athletes won a total of one silver medal, matching their medal haul from the 2018 Olympics, although that medal was a gold. Therefore, this result can be considered the worst since 2010 when Ukraine did not win any medals.

Competitors
The following is the list of number of competitors participating at the Games per sport.

Medallists

Alpine skiing

By meeting the basic qualification standards Ukraine qualified one male and one female alpine skier.

Biathlon

Men

Women

Mixed

Bobsleigh

Lidiia Hunko failed a doping test during the Olympics and was suspended on 15 February.

Cross-country skiing

Ukraine qualified two male and five female cross-country skiers.

Valiantsina Kaminskaya failed a doping test during the Olympics and was suspended on 16 February.

Distance
Men

Women

Sprint

Figure skating

In the 2021 World Figure Skating Championships in Stockholm, Sweden, Ukraine secured one quota in the men's competition and one quota in the ice dance competition.

Freestyle skiing

Ukraine had qualified for the mixed team event but was not allowed by the Chinese authorities to compete due to positive COVID-19 tests by Kotovskyi, Okipniuk, and Novosad.

Aerials

Luge

Women

Mixed

Nordic combined

Short track speed skating 

Ukraine has qualified one male and one female short track speed skater.

Skeleton

Ski jumping

Men

Snowboarding

Parallel

References

Nations at the 2022 Winter Olympics
2022
Winter Olympics